The Simeulue language is spoken by the Simeulue people of Simeulue off the western coast of Sumatra, Indonesia.

Names
Simeulue is also called , which literally means 'Where are you going?'. Ethnologue also lists Long Bano, Simalur, Simeuloë, and Simulul as alternate names.

Varieties
Simeulue is spoken in five of eight subdistricts (kecamatan) of Simeulue Regency. It includes two dialects.
 Defayan: spoken in the four eastern subdistricts of Teupah Selatan, Simeulue Timur, Teupah Barat, and Teluk Dalam
 Simolol (prestige dialect): spoken around Kampung Aie and Simeulue Tengah
 Leukon: spoken in two villages in Alafan, namely Langi and Lafakha.
 Haloban: spoken in two villages in Banyak Islands, namely Haloban and Asantola.

Sikule, related to Nias, is spoken in Salang, Alafan and Simeulue Barat in northern Simeulue, while Jamu (also called Kamano), related to Minangkabau, is spoken in the capital city of Sinabang and has become the lingua franca of the island.

See also 
 Simeulue people
 Sikule language

References

Further reading 
 
 

Northwest Sumatra–Barrier Islands languages
Languages of Indonesia
Languages of Aceh